The Raise the Wage Act is a proposed United States law that would increase the federal minimum wage to US$15. It has been introduced in each United States Congress since 2017.

Background

Federal Minimum Wage 
The minimum wage in the United States is set by U.S. labor law and a range of state and local laws. The first federal minimum wage was created as part of the National Industrial Recovery Act of 1933, signed into law by President Franklin D. Roosevelt, but declared unconstitutional. In 1938 the Fair Labor Standards Act established it at $0.25 an hour ($5.19 in 2022 dollars). Its purchasing power peaked in 1968 at $1.60 ($13.46 in 2022 dollars). The Fair Minimum Wage Act of 2007 has set the minimum wage at $7.25 per hour since 2009. The real value of the federal minimum wage in 2022 dollars has decreased by 46% since its inflation-adjusted peak in February 1968.

Provisions

Minimum Wage Increases 
The most recently introduced bill would gradually increase the minimum wage over the next 5 years as follows:

Tipped Employees 
The bill raises the minimum wage to $4.95 an hour for tipped employees and their employers.

New Employees that are 20 years old or less 
The bill raises the minimum wage to $6.00 an hour for newly hired employees who are 20 years older or less.

Legislative history 
As of October 25, 2022:

See also 

 List of bills in the 115th United States Congress
 List of bills in the 116th United States Congress
 List of bills in the 117th United States Congress
 Minimum wage

References

External links 

Proposed legislation of the 115th United States Congress
Proposed legislation of the 116th United States Congress
Proposed legislation of the 117th United States Congress
Minimum wage law